Andar (also known as Andarī) is a village in Kheyrgu Rural District, Alamarvdasht District, Lamerd County, Fars Province, Iran. At the 2006 census, its population was 149, in 27 families.

References 

Populated places in Lamerd County